Felicity Madeline Galvez, OAM (born 4 March 1985) is an Australian swimmer and two-time Olympic gold medalist. She was an Australian Institute of Sport scholarship holder.
She was educated at Runnymede College in Madrid.

Career 
She broke both the short course 50-metre and 100-metre butterfly world records in 2008, in 25.32 and 55.89, respectively.  The 100-metre record lasted for less than a month, as teammate Libby Trickett lowered it on 26 April 2008.  The 50-metre record was broken by Therese Alshammar during the Stockholm stop of the 2008 FINA World Cup Series, but Marieke Guehrer returned it to Australian hands just days later. Galvez broke the 100m butterfly short course world record again at the 2009 FINA World Cup Series in Stockholm with a 55.46. That is 0.22 seconds faster than the previous mark of 55.68 set by Australian teammate, Jessicah Schipper on 12 August 2009.

Career best times

See also
 List of Olympic medalists in swimming (women)
 List of World Aquatics Championships medalists in swimming (women)
 List of Commonwealth Games medallists in swimming (women)
 World record progression 50 metres butterfly
 World record progression 100 metres butterfly

References

External links
 
 
 
 
 
 

1985 births
Living people
Australian female butterfly swimmers
World record setters in swimming
Swimmers at the 2008 Summer Olympics
Olympic swimmers of Australia
Olympic gold medalists for Australia
Sportswomen from Victoria (Australia)
Commonwealth Games gold medallists for Australia
Swimmers at the 2010 Commonwealth Games
Australian female freestyle swimmers
World Aquatics Championships medalists in swimming
Australian Institute of Sport swimmers
Medalists at the FINA World Swimming Championships (25 m)
Medalists at the 2008 Summer Olympics
People educated at MLC School
Swimmers from Melbourne
Swimmers at the 2004 Summer Olympics
Commonwealth Games silver medallists for Australia
Swimmers at the 2006 Commonwealth Games
Olympic gold medalists in swimming
Commonwealth Games medallists in swimming
Recipients of the Medal of the Order of Australia
Medallists at the 2006 Commonwealth Games
Medallists at the 2010 Commonwealth Games